Iris muscle may refer to:
Iris sphincter muscle
Iris dilator muscle